A Bank State Branch (often referred to as  "BSB") is the name used in Australia for a bank code, which is a branch identifier. The BSB is normally used in association with the account number system used by each financial institution. The structure of the BSB + account number does not permit for account numbers to be transferable between financial institutions. While similar in structure, the New Zealand and Australian systems are only used in domestic transactions and are incompatible with each other. For international transfers, a SWIFT code is used in addition to the BSB and account number.

The BSB identifier consists of six numerals, the first two or three of which is a bank identifier. Many banks only have one BSB for all branches and accounts. The BSB is used for processing of paper and electronic transactions, but not in payment card numbering.

In Australia, the Australian Payments Network (AusPayNet) is now the regulatory body of cheque clearances and of the BSB codes in Australia. AusPayNet assigns the bank code to a financial institution and the financial institution allocates the other digits to its branches, in line with guidelines set by AusPayNet. Some financial institutions have more than one bank identifier, arising from mergers of financial institutions or consolidating by banks of their trading and savings banks operations. As of March 2012, almost 14,300 unique BSB code values were in use.

Usage
In Australia, BSB codes are allocated by the Australian Payments Network (AusPayNet). BSB codes are used in a number of payment systems in Australia. To access the various clearance systems a financial institution must have its own BSB or use an intermediary with a BSB.

Paper transactions
Cheques are the least used form of non-cash payment in Australia, but the most by value. Financial institutions are required to include BSB and bank account numbers on cheques, at the bottom of the cheque in MICR form, which identify the specific bank account number to be debited. BSB codes are also used on pre-printed deposit and other vouchers. Paper transactions are processed under the Australian Paper Clearing System (APCS) (also known as CS1) drawn up by AusPayNet. Account instructions which do not have a BSB code are processed manually.

Electronic transactions
Electronic fund transfers (EFT) are the most common method of non-cash payment in Australia. EFT transactions between bank accounts use the Direct Entry system or the New Payments Platform (NPP). For transfers using the Direct Entry system, BSB and bank account numbers must be given for the accounts to be debited as well as for the account to which funds are to be transferred. For transfers using the NPP, BSB and account numbers or a payee's PayID must be given for the payee account to be credited.  Electronic direct entry transactions are processed under the Bulk Electronic Clearing System (BECS) (also known as CS2) drawn up by AusPayNet. NPP transactions are processed under the NPP Regulations administered by NPP Australia Limited. The requirement for two-sided BSBs is eased in transactions involving payment cards, such as credit cards or debit cards, and in BPAY transactions, in which one side of the transfer is an account which includes the BSB electronically linked to the card and BPAY biller.

International transactions
For incoming international transfers, SWIFT codes are used in addition to the Basic Bank Account Number (BBAN), which comprises a BSB and bank account number. There is no public discussion of the adoption of IBAN identifiers for incoming international transactions. Any process towards IBAN would involve considerable changes to bank software and computer systems, and the requirement for financial institutions to adopt defined length account numbers. Outgoing international transfers must use either the SWIFT or IBAN system in use in the destination country, which would incorporate that country's format for BBAN.

Format
The BSB is a six-digit code, usually presented as nnn-nnn. Originally, the format of the BSB code was for the first two digits to indicate the "bank" and the other four digits specified the "branch" of that financial institution, the first digit of which was the state code indicating the state where the branch was located. Some banks may use only one BSB for all branches.

For example, the Australian BSB code "033088" breaks down to:
 03 = Westpac, historically the trading operation
 3 = Victoria
 088 = 383 Chapel Street, Prahran

Some of the larger banks had two bank codes, with separate codes for their trading (cheque) and savings bank entities. The first digit of the bank code was either 0 (for trading bank accounts) or 1 (for savings bank accounts), with a common second digit. For example, 03 was for Westpac's trading accounts, while 73 was for Westpac's savings accounts. Some banks continue to use two bank codes, which today are of only historic and legacy significance.

History

Following the introduction in the United Kingdom in the 1960s of a "sort code", a comparable BSB identifier system was introduced in Australia in the early 1970s to streamline cheque clearance through the banking system in Australia. At the time the clearance systems were open only to financial institutions registered as banks. The BSB and account number was printed on cheques in MICR format to streamline the process of data capture as well as for mechanical sorting and bundling of the physical cheques for forwarding to the payer bank branch for final cheque clearance. Other financial institutions had to use banks as intermediaries to access the clearance of their "payment orders", which were the non-banking equivalents of cheques.

Since then, the use of BSBs has been extended to electronic transactions, but not in payment card numbering.

With the restructuring of the financial system in Australia, other financial institutions were given direct access to the clearing systems, and the structure of the BSB has had to be modified. While banks generally still follow the traditional state branch structure, building societies and credit unions often do not. This is because many of these institutions use an intermediary; for example, BSBs such as 80xxxx are administered by Cuscal, 579xxx are administered by Australian Settlements Limited, whereas 704xxx is administered by Indue. In these situations, the building society or credit union is identified by the 'state' and 'branch' components of the BSB whereas the 'bank' refers to the intermediary. Depending on the intermediary used, building societies (both current and former) BSBs generally start with 63xxxx and most credit unions BSBs will use either 704xxx or 80xxxx. The state code structure is not always used in these situations. For example, Bendigo Bank started as a building society in Victoria but now uses a single BSB nationally (633-000) while the Queensland-based Heritage Bank, also a former building society, uses 638xxx. Suncorp Bank uses 484-799 for all deposit accounts regardless of which branch or state the account was opened in.

Furthermore, recent changes in Australia's financial system have allowed larger building societies and credit unions to establish their own BSBs, even if they are using an intermediary. Having their own BSB allows a financial institution to create new products and offer additional services.

List of Australian bank codes

State codes
Historically, the major banks structured their BSB codes by states. This is largely historic and have only limited significance in electronic banking. For those that still maintain state codes, the state code is the first of the four digit branch field, as follows:
 2 - Australian Capital Territory, New South Wales
 3 - Victoria
 4 - Queensland
 5 - South Australia, Northern Territory
 6 - Western Australia
 7 - Tasmania
 8, 9 - (intermediary)

See also
 Bank card number
 ISO 9362, the standard for SWIFT codes, international bank identifiers
 List of banks in Australia
 New Zealand bank account prefix
 ABA routing transit number
 Routing number (Canada)
 Sort code, a number used in the United Kingdom and Ireland that is similar to the BSB

References

External links
 Australian Payments Network Ltd (AusPayNet), the body that regulates BSB numbers
 Look up BSB Numbers on the Official AusPayNet web site (constantly updated)

Banking in Australia
Bank codes